The 1962 Wyoming gubernatorial election took place on November 7, 1962. Incumbent Democratic Governor Jack R. Gage, who ascended to the governorship after his successor, John J. Hickey, appointed himself to the U.S. Senate in 1961, ran for re-election. After beating back a strong challenge from former Secretary of State William M. Jack in the Democratic primary, he then faced Republican nominee Clifford Hansen, the President of the University of Wyoming Board of Trustees and a former Teton County Commissioner. The year proved poor for Wyoming Democrats, as Hansen handily defeated Gage and as Senator Hickey was defeated for re-election by former Governor Milward Simpson.

Democratic primary

Candidates
Jack R. Gage, incumbent Governor
William M. Jack, former Secretary of State of Wyoming, 1954 Democratic nominee for Governor

Republican primary

Candidates
Clifford Hansen, President of the University of Wyoming Board of Trustees and former Teton County Commissioner
Charles M. Crowell, former State Representative
R. E. Cheever, former Mayor of Cheyenne

Results

References

Wyoming

1962
1962 Wyoming elections
November 1962 events in the United States